Frédéric Bellais (born 2 March 1983) is a retired French para table tennis player who competed in international elite events. He is a European champion and a World silver medalist. Bellais has competed at the 2012 Paralympic Games, he reached the quarterfinals in the men's singles Class 9 where he got defeated by the eventual Paralympic champion Ma Lin.

References

1983 births
Living people
Sportspeople from Caen
Paralympic table tennis players of France
Table tennis players at the 2012 Summer Paralympics
French male table tennis players
21st-century French people
20th-century French people